The 2019–20 Washington Huskies men's basketball team represented the University of Washington in the 2019–20 NCAA Division I men's basketball season. The Huskies, led by third-year head coach Mike Hopkins, played their home games at Alaska Airlines Arena at Hec Edmundson Pavilion in Seattle, Washington as members of the Pac-12 Conference. They finished the season 15–17, 5–13 in Pac-12 play to finish in last place. They lost in the first round of the Pac-12 tournament to Arizona.

Previous season
The Huskies finished the 2018–19 season 27–9, 15–2 in Pac-12 play to finish in first place. Coach Hopkins received back to back Pac-12 Coach of the Year awards. Matisse Thybulle was named Pac-12 Defender of the Year. Jaylen Nowell was named Pac-12 Player of the Year. The Huskies lost to Oregon in the championship game of the Pac-12 tournament. They received an at-large invitation to the NCAA tournament as a nine seed in the Midwest Region where they defeated eight seed and 25th ranked Utah State in the first round before losing to the first seed and third ranked North Carolina in the second round. On January 19, 2019 Washington became the first team in college basketball history to record 1000 wins in same arena.

Off-season

Departures

Incoming transfers

Quade Green transferred from Kentucky at the end of their Fall quarter in 2018. He was scheduled to be eligible to play with the Huskies starting December 17, 2019 but after a petition to NCAA it was deemed that he is eligible to play for the full 2019–20 season.

2019 recruiting class

Roster

Jan. 9, 2020 – Quade Green ruled academically ineligible for winter quarter.

Depth chart

Schedule and results

|-
!colspan=12 style=| Exhibition

|-
!colspan=12 style=|Non-conference regular season

|-
!colspan=12 style=| Pac-12 regular season

|-
!colspan=12 style=| Pac-12 Tournament

|-

Rankings

*AP does not release post-NCAA Tournament rankings.^Coaches did not release a Week 2 poll.

Awards and honors

Freshman of the Week

All Pac-12 Team

 First team: Isaiah Stewart

Pac-12 All-Freshman Team
 Isaiah Stewart

References

Washington Huskies men's basketball seasons
Washington
Washington Huskies basketball, men
Washington Huskies basketball, men